Grimmelshausen is a municipality in the district of Hildburghausen, in Thuringia, Germany.

Grimmelshausen may also refer to:
Hans Jakob Christoffel von Grimmelshausen, a German author
Grimmelshausen-Preis, a German literary award